Mojzesovo is a village and municipality in the Nové Zámky District in the Nitra Region of south-west Slovakia.

History
In historical records the village was first mentioned in 1273.

During its existence, this village was named Izdeg, name of the only family of the village of Mojzesovo who survived from Turkish invasion.

Geography
The village lies at an altitude of 130 metres and covers an area of 7.495 km². It has a population of about 1370 people.

Ethnicity
The population is about 99.5% Slovak.

Facilities
The village has a public library, a gym and football pitch.

External links

statistics.sc
Mojzesovo – Nové Zámky Okolie

Villages and municipalities in Nové Zámky District